The Fort Stevenson State Park Arboretum is an arboretum located near the campground at Fort Stevenson State Park [] on the north shore of Lake Sakakawea approximately 3 miles (5 km) south of Garrison, North Dakota.

The arboretum contains over 50 native and non-native trees, shrubs, wildflowers and grasses, including Eleagnus angustifolia, Juniperus scopulorum, Salix exigua, and Ulmus pumila.

See also
List of botanical gardens in the United States

External links

Arboreta in North Dakota
Protected areas of McLean County, North Dakota